Dura may also refer to: Đura such as, for example, Đura Bajalović

Geography
 Dura language, a critically endangered language of Nepal
 Dura, Africa, an ancient city and former bishopric, now a Catholic titular see
 Dura-Europos, an ancient city located in modern-day Syria, founded in 303 BCE and abandoned in 256–257 CE
 Dora, Baghdad, alternately transliterated "al-Dura", a neighborhood in the Rasheed administrative district in Southern Baghdad, Iraq
 Dura, Hebron, a Palestinian town in the southern West Bank located eleven kilometers southwest of Hebron in the Hebron Governorate
 Dura, Manyas, a village in Turkey
 Dura al-Qar', a Palestinian town in the Ramallah and al-Bireh Governorate
 Cișmigiu Gardens, originally named "Lake of Dura the merchant", a public park near the center of Bucharest, Romania that surrounds an artificial lake

Science
 Dura mater, the outermost of the three ('hard', dura in Latin) layers of the meninges surrounding the brain and spinal cord
 Dura (moth), a genus of moths

Other
"Dura" (song), Daddy Yankee
Dura Dura, Turkish album
 Dura Automotive Systems, an American automotive company headquartered in Auburn Hills, Michigan and specializing in automobile components